The Santana 22 is an American trailerable sailboat, that was designed by Gary Mull and first built in 1966.

Production
The boat was built by W. D. Schock Corporation in the United States from 1966 to 2010. Some were also built in Australia by the Triton Boat Company. A total of 800 were completed, but the design is currently out of production.

W. D. Schock Corp records indicate that they built 747 boats between 1969 and 1979.

Design
The Santana 22 was Mull's first design, commissioned by Bill Schock, whom Mull had met in 1965. Mull described the design process, "Bill Schock kept saying, 'What would you do if you were going to draw a boat that would be faster than a Cal 20?' That was the real yardstick boat at that time. We were sketching on the backs of napkins, as we do. "Right after that lunch, I had to fly to New York, and when I came back, there were all these messages on the desk, 'Call Bill Schock; Call Bill Schock,' so I called and said 'What do you need?' And he said 'Where the hell are the drawings?' I said, 'What drawings?' He said, 'You said you were going to design a boat for me.' I said, 'No, you said you were going to call me if you wanted me to.' And he said, 'Well, I called.' I said, 'Oh!' And that got me started designing sailboats. The first one was the Santana 22."

The design competed with the Jensen Marine Cal 20 sailboat in the market.

The Santana 22 is a small recreational keelboat, built predominantly of fiberglass, with wood trim. It has a masthead sloop rig, an internally-mounted spade-type rudder and a fixed fin keel. It displaces  and carries  of ballast.

The boat is normally fitted with a small  outboard motor for docking and maneuvering.

The design has sleeping accommodation for four people, with a double "V"-berth in the bow cabin and two straight settee quarter berths in the main cabin. The galley is located on both sides just after on the bow cabin. The galley is equipped with an optional stove to starboard and a sink to port. The head is located in the bow cabin, centered under the "V"-berth.

The boat has a PHRF racing average handicap of 249 with a high of 277 and low of 234.

Operational history
In a 2010 review Steve Henkel wrote, "best features: Compared to her comp[etitor]s, the Santana may be considered old-fashioned, with her narrow beam and squared off fin keel, spade-rudder underbody. But she is a wholesome design that many consider ageless—easy and fun to sail, forgiving, and still good-looking after all these years ... Worst features: As a 1965 design she is, after all, a bit old-fashioned. And compared with her comp[etitor]s, her deeper draft makes her harder to launch from a trailer."

See also
List of sailing boat types

Similar sailboats
Alberg 22
Buccaneer 220
Cape Dory 22
CS 22
DS-22
Edel 665
Falmouth Cutter 22
Hunter 22
Marlow-Hunter 22
Marshall 22
Nonsuch 22
Pearson Electra
Pearson Ensign
Ranger 22
Seaward 22
Spindrift 22
Starwind 223
Tanzer 22
Triton 22
US Yachts US 22

References

Keelboats
1960s sailboat type designs
Sailing yachts
Trailer sailers
Sailboat type designs by Gary Mull
Sailboat types built by W. D. Schock Corp
Sailboat types built by Triton Boat Company